Fauzia Najjemba (born 7 October 2003) is a Ugandan footballer who plays as a striker for Kazakhstan Women's Football Championship club BIIK Kazygurt and the Uganda women's national team.

Early life
Najjemba was raised in Nakifuma and belongs to the Baganda.

Club career
Najjemba has played for Kampala Queens FC in Uganda.

International career
Najjemba capped for Uganda at senior level during the 2022 Africa Women Cup of Nations qualification.

International goals
Scores and results list Uganda goal tally first

References

External links

2003 births
Living people
People from Mukono District
Ugandan women's footballers
Women's association football forwards
BIIK Kazygurt players
Uganda women's international footballers
Ugandan expatriate women's footballers
Ugandan expatriate sportspeople in Kazakhstan
Expatriate women's footballers in Kazakhstan
Ganda people